The University of Veterinary Science, Yezin, located in Yezin in the outskirts of Naypyidaw, is the only university of veterinary science in Myanmar (Burma). The university offers a six-year Bachelor of Veterinary Science (BVSc) program. Since 2014, UVS renamed its BVSc degree (UK format) to DVM (Doctor of Veterinary Medicine: USA format) and, since then, all new graduates received DVM title instead. It accepts about 100 students a year. It has launched a four-year Bachelor of Animal Science (BASc) program since 2014. It accepts about 100 students a year.<The global new light of Myanmar, daily news paper, December 30,2018,https://www.burmalibrary.org/en/category/the-global-new-light-of-myanmar-2018> It also offers graduate (PhD, MPhil, MVM and MVSc) degree programs. The language of instruction at UVS is English.

History
Veterinary science education in Myanmar began in 1890 during the British colonial rule when the Veterinary Assistant Training School was opened at Shan Road in Kyimyindaing, Yangon. The school offered a two-year program, and senior veterinary officer Bhattiwallah was its first principal. In 1920, the school was upgraded, and the faculty was expanded by 12 veterinary inspectors and five veterinary superintendents, all non-Burmese. In 1923, the first Burmese veterinarian, Pe Than, a graduate of Bengal Veterinary College, was appointed a vet superintendent at the school. In February 1925, Governor Sir Harcourt Butler laid the foundation stone for the construction of the school's new building in Insein that would later bear his name. By 1931, the original two-year program had been extended to three years.

In 1957, the Veterinary College, a Faculty of Rangoon University was established at the Insein campus. The school's four-year BSc (Veterinary) program accepted university students who passed Intermediate Science Part II with distinctions in zoology, chemistry and physics. In 1964, the college became the Institute of Animal Husbandry and Veterinary Science (IAHVS), under the Ministry of Education, offering a six-year BVSc program. From 1957 to 1975, the two-year vet assistant program at the Veterinary Assistant Training School and the bachelor's degree program at the IAHVS were concurrently offered by two different government ministries. In 1981, the IAHVS was relocated to Yezin, Pyinmana (now part of Naypyidaw). In October 1999, the institute's name was formally changed to the present name in both English and Burmese.

During the 1990s, the UVS like most universities in the country was repeatedly closed by the military government fearing of student unrest. On 31 December 1994, the institute came under the administration of the Ministry of Livestock and Fisheries.

The university began offering postgraduate courses for MPhil in 1988, MVSc and MSc programs in 1992, and three-year doctoral (PhD) programs in 2007. The government has sent some of the faculty to the Universiti Putra Malaysia for doctoral studies. The total number of graduates at the university between 1957 and 2012 was 4409.

The Japanese government has sponsored two to three Burmese veterinarians for MSc and PhD courses each year since 2000. A new generation of foreign trained veterinarians has begun to take over the teaching roles at the UVS, with some of them as departmental head and/or professors. Some staff from UVS were also supported by German Academic Exchange (Deutscher Akademisher Austauschdienst, DAAD). More members of staff received scholarships from DAAD.

Departments
The University of Veterinary Science comprises a rector's office and 26 departments:

 Rector's Office
 Department of Myanmarsar
 Department of English
 Department of Mathematics
 Department of Physics
 Department of Chemistry
 Department of Zoology
 Department of Botany
 Department of Anatomy
 Department of Physiology and Biochemistry
 Department of Pathology and Microbiology
 Department of Pharmacology and Parasitology
 Department of Surgery and Theriogenology
 Department of Medicine
 Department of Animal Science
 Department of Veterinary Public Health
 Department of Animal Nutrition
 Department of Aquaculture and Aquatic Diseases
 Department of Genetics and Animal Breeding
 Veterinary Teaching Hospital
 Demonstration Farms
 Department of International Relation and Information Technology
 Library
 Department of Account
 Department of Training and Students' Affairs
 Department of Engineering

Notable alumni and faculty
 Dr. Khyne U Mar: elephant veterinarian and author; co-founder of an elephant care and research center
 Professor Dr. Kyaw Sunn: winner of 2005 Research Award of the Association of Asian Veterinary Schools
 Professor Dr. Myint Thein (former rector): Director General; winner of 2004 Research Award of the Association of Asian Veterinary Schools

References

8. University of Veterinary Science holds 32nd graduation <The global new light of Myanmar, daily news paper, December 30,2018,https://www.burmalibrary.org/en/category/the-global-new-light-of-myanmar-2018>

External links 
 
University of Veterinary Science at Facebook
University of Veterinary Science at Twitter

Universities and colleges in Yezin
Universities and colleges in Mandalay Region
Medical schools in Myanmar
Universities and colleges in Myanmar
Agricultural organisations based in Myanmar
Educational institutions established in 1957
Veterinary schools in Myanmar
1957 establishments in Burma